The 1927 Colgate football team represented Colgate University as an independent during the 1927 college football season. In it second season under head coach George Hauser, Colgate compiled a 4–2–3 record and outscored opponents by  a total of 99 to 33.

Schedule

References

Colgate
Colgate Raiders football seasons
Colgate football